Thomas Davis Rust (born July 21, 1941) is an American politician of the Republican Party. He is a former member of the Virginia House of Delegates, representing the 86th District from 2002 to 2016. Previously, he was mayor of Herndon, Virginia for 19 years (1976–84, 1990–2001).

Political 

Rust was first elected to the Herndon Town Council in 1971, where he served until he was elected mayor of the Town of Herndon in 1976, a position he held until 1984.  He was elected mayor again in 1990 and served until 2001 .

In 2001, Rust was elected delegate for the 86th District with 63% of the vote against Jim Kelly .  A civil engineer, Rust has served on the Committees on Transportation, Education, Science and Technology, and Commerce and Labor.  His notable legislation includes allowing the Commonwealth Transportation Board to establish a statewide transportation plan using highway corridors for long-term, regional planning .

State and local elected offices 

 Mayor, Town of Herndon, (1976–1984, 1990–2001)
 Herndon Town Council (1971–1976)

House of Delegates committees (2009) 
 Commerce and Labor
 Education (Chair of Subcommittee on Higher Education)
 Science and Technology (Vice chair)
 Transportation (Chair of Subcommittee #4)

References

External links
Official website

Living people
Republican Party members of the Virginia House of Delegates
People from Herndon, Virginia
People from Front Royal, Virginia
Mayors of places in Virginia
1941 births
George Washington University School of Engineering and Applied Science alumni
21st-century American politicians